W. H. "Hank" Norton (October 15, 1927 – January 16, 2019) was an American football coach.

Early life 
He served as the head coach at Ferrum College in Ferrum, Virginia from 1960 to 1993.  Norton coached Ferrum to four NJCAA National Football Championships and then guided the program to four-year NCAA varsity status in 1985.

Head coaching record

College

References

1927 births
 2019 deaths
Ferrum Panthers football coaches
High school football coaches in Virginia
Junior college football coaches in the United States
University of Lynchburg alumni
Sportspeople from Huntington, West Virginia